National Unity Day, Union Day, Unification Day may refer to:

National unification
Alphabetic by country.
 National Unity Day (Belarus), a holiday in Belarus on September 17
 Unification Day (Bulgaria), a holiday in Bulgaria on September 6
 Unity Day (Burundi), a holiday in Burundi on February 5
 National Unity Day, a holiday in Georgia on April 9
 National Unity Day, a holiday in Hungary on June 4
 German Unity Day, a holiday in Germany on October 3
 National Unity Day (India), a holiday in India on October 31
 Kazakhstan People's Unity Day, a holiday in Kazakhstan on May 1
 Great Union Day, a holiday in Romania on December 1
 Unity Day (Russia), a holiday in Russia on November 4 
 Unity Day (Tajikistan), a holiday in Tajikistan on June 27 
 Day of Unity of Ukraine, a holiday in Ukraine on January 22
 Unity Day (United States), a holiday in the United States in October
 Unity Day (Vanuatu), a holiday in Vanuatu on November 29
 Unity Day (Yemen), a holiday in Yemen on May 22
 Unity Day (Zambia), a holiday in Zambia on the first Tuesday of July
 Unity Day (Zimbabwe), a holiday in Zimbabwe on December 22

Community unity celebrations
 Unity Day (Leeds), a free open air festival in Leeds in early August
 Unity Day (Philadelphia), a celebration in August in Philadelphia